Pins is the plural of "pin", a fastening device.

PINS or Pins may also refer to:
 PINS (band), an English all-female rock group
 PINS, or person in need of supervision, (in United States) a juvenile not currently living with a parent or guardian
 PINS, or the Planning Inspectorate for England and Wales, a United Kingdom government agency
 Pinterest stock ticker

Places
From the French plural for "pines"
Les Pins, a commune in Charente, France
 Île des pins, island in New Caledonia, Pacific Ocean 	
 L'Île-des-Pins, a commune in New Caledonia, Pacific Ocean	
 Lac des Pins (Aumond, Quebec), a lake in Canada
Pointe aux Pins, a peninsula in Lake Erie, Canada
Pointe Aux Pins, Michigan, an unincorporated community in Bois Blanc Township, Michigan, United States
Rivière aux Pins (disambiguation), several rivers
Rivière des Pins (disambiguation), several rivers

People with the name
Jacob Pins (1917-2005), German-born Israeli artist and collector
Odon de Pins (died 1296), Grand Master of the Knights Hospitaller

See also

 Including many placenames ending in "-les-pins" 
Pin (disambiguation)